The 15th Grand National Assembly of Turkey existed from 14 October 1973 to 5 June 1977.
There were 450 MPs in the lower house. Republican People's Party (CHP) held the plurality. Justice Party (AP) was the next party. National Salvation Party (MSP), Democratic Party (DP), Republican Reliance Party (CGP), Nationalist Movement Party (MHP) Turkey Unity Party (TBP) were the other parties.

Main parliamentary milestones 
Some of the important events in the history of the parliament are the following:
7 November 1973  – Bülent Ecevit of CHP could not form a government
17 November 1973 – Süleyman Demirel of AP could not form a government
18 December 1973 – Kemal Güven of CHP was elected as the speaker of the Turkish parliament after 27 rounds
19 January 1974 – Naim Talu, a former prime minister could not form a government
26 January 1974 - Bülent Ecevit formed the 37th government of Turkey (a coalition of CHP and MSP)
14 May 1974 - Amnesty law; disagreement between the coalition partners
 11 July 1974 – Parliament discussed the Cyprus issue 
17 Noıvember 1974 – Sadi Irmak, an independent senator, formed the 38th government of Turkey
29 November 1974 – Failing to receive the vote of confidence Sadi Irmak resigned; beginning of a long government crisis  
1 April 1975 - Süleyman Demirel of AP formed the 39th government of Turkey; a coalition government usually called First National Front ( 1.MC), the partners being MSP, CGP and MHP.
 7 June 1977 - General elections

References

1973 establishments in Turkey
1977 disestablishments in Turkey
Terms of the Grand National Assembly of Turkey
15th parliament of Turkey
Republican People's Party (Turkey)
Justice Party (Turkey)
Nationalist Movement Party
Democratic Party (Turkey, 1970)
Republican Reliance Party
National Salvation Party
Political history of Turkey